The Right Hon. William Adam of Blair Adam  (2 August 175117 February 1839) was a Scottish advocate, barrister, politician and judge. He served as Solicitor General for Scotland (1802–1805) and as Lord Chief Commissioner of the Jury Court (1815–39).

His political career was affected by his father's periodic financial problems, as sometimes the family had substantial wealth and sometimes it was in difficulties, forcing Adam to concentrate his attention on his legal practice. He rose to be Lord Lieutenant of Kinross-shire.

His most important contribution to Scottish Law was probably the introduction of trial by jury on civil (non-criminal) cases.

Life

William Adam was the only surviving son of Jean Ramsay and John Adam of Blairadam, architect and master mason to the Board of Ordnance in Scotland, of Maryburgh, Kinross. His uncle was the architect Robert Adam. 

Blairadam House where he was born lies just north of Kelty in Fife but on an isolated side road. He was educated at the High School in Edinburgh, then studied law at the University of Edinburgh and Christ Church, Oxford. He trained further at Lincoln's Inn from 1769, to qualify as an English barrister. He was admitted to the Faculty of Advocates in 1773 and was eventually called to the English bar in 1782.

Adam represented a number of constituencies in Parliament. He was MP for the rotten borough of Gatton 1774–1780. He represented Wigtown Burghs 1780–1784. He was a Treasury nominee for that seat, as a supporter of Lord North. He moved to another Scottish Burgh seat Elgin Burghs, 1784–1790. 

In 1790–1794, he sat for Ross-shire. His last Parliamentary seat was Kincardineshire, which he represented from 1806 until he became a Judge in January 1812.

Adam took a very hard line on American issues in the early part of his political career. He was critical of his future political leader Lord North for being too conciliatory before the outbreak of fighting. However, after pursuing an independent course up to 25 November 1779, he then announced in the House of Commons that he was now going to support Lord North. After that he became a loyal friend and defender of North.

Adam particularly disliked the leading opposition figure Charles James Fox. At one stage they fought a duel. He also attacked Fox verbally in Parliament.

Adam was appointed to the minor political office of Treasurer of the Ordnance. He held this office twice, first between September 1780 and May 1782 and again April–December 1783.

On 17–18 February 1783, Adam spoke and voted against peace with the United States. After that, despite his past animosity to Charles James Fox, Adam advocated the Fox-North Coalition, as the only way to stop Lord North's party becoming politically irrelevant. Adam was active in gathering detailed information about the Scottish constituencies, to help his political associates.

Thereafter, he was less involved in politics as he developed his career at the English bar. Through his friendship with the Prince of Wales he was appointed Solicitor General for Scotland (1802–1805) and then Attorney General to the Prince (1805–1806). From 1806 to 1815 he was Chancellor of the Duchy of Cornwall, another office in the gift of the Prince.

Adam was Lord Lieutenant of Kinross-shire from 1802 until his death. He became a friend of Sir Walter Scott. In 1812, he published Vitruvius Scoticus, a collection of his grandfather William Adam's architectural projects, which the elder William had first initiated in 1727.

During the Regency of the Prince of Wales, Adam received judicial office in Scotland. Between 1814 and 1819 he was a Baron of the Scottish Court of Exchequer. Adam became a member of the Privy Council on 17 March 1815. He became Lord Chief Commissioner of the Scottish jury court from 1815 until his death.

In 1832-33, his home address was 31 Charlotte Square in Edinburgh.

He died in Edinburgh on 17 February 1839, and was buried at Greyfriars Kirkyard He lies in the huge family vault built for his grandfather, William Adam the architect, facing his father, John Adam. The vault lies south-west of the church, in front of the Covenanters Prison.

Family
On 7 May 1777, William Adam married Eleanora Elphinstone (died 4 February 1800), daughter of Charles, 10th Lord Elphinstone. They had six children:

John (4 May 17794 June 1825), civil servant of the East India Company, served as acting Governor-General of India in 1823.
Charles (6 October 178016 September 1853), Admiral in the Royal Navy, MP,
William George KC (6 December 178116 May 1839), lawyer, Accountant-General of the Court of Chancery.
Frederick (17 June 178417 August 1853), General in the British Army, Governor of Madras 1832–37.
Francis James (24 March 17918 June 1820) died of yellow fever at sea with Charles
Clementina (died 29 October 1877), married on 27 April 1807, John Anstruther-Thomson, DL, of Charleton, Fife.

Notes

References
History of Parliament: House of Commons 1754–1790, by Sir Lewis Namier and James Brooke (Sidgwick & Jackson 1964)

External links

 

1751 births
1839 deaths
19th-century Scottish politicians
18th-century Scottish people
19th-century Scottish people
People from Perth and Kinross
People educated at the Royal High School, Edinburgh
Alumni of the University of Edinburgh School of Law
Alumni of Christ Church, Oxford
Burials at Greyfriars Kirkyard
Fellows of the Royal Society of Edinburgh
Lord-Lieutenants of Kinross-shire
Members of the Faculty of Advocates
Members of Lincoln's Inn
Members of the Parliament of Great Britain for English constituencies
Members of the Parliament of Great Britain for Scottish constituencies
Members of the Privy Council of the United Kingdom
Members of the Parliament of the United Kingdom for Scottish constituencies
Politics of Dumfries and Galloway
Politics of Moray
Politics of Highland (council area)
Politics of Aberdeenshire
Politics of Clackmannanshire
Politics of Perth and Kinross
Scottish architecture writers
Barons of the Court of Exchequer (Scotland)
Scottish King's Counsel
Scottish Tory MPs (pre-1912)
Solicitors General for Scotland
British MPs 1774–1780
British MPs 1780–1784
British MPs 1790–1796
UK MPs 1806–1807
UK MPs 1807–1812